Dame Caroline Leigh Watkins , is an English academic, the Professor of Stroke and Older People's Care - and Director of Research and Innovation - of the College of Health and Wellbeing, University of Central Lancashire. She leads the Clinical Practice Research Unit (CPRU) for stroke research and is Director of Lancashire Clinical Trials Unit (Lancashire CTU). She is also the  Director of Capacity Building and Implementation for National Institute for Health Research Collaboration for Leadership in Applied Health Research and Care North West Coast (NIHR CLAHRC NWC).

She was awarded the honour of Dame (DBE) in the 2017 New Year Honours, for services to Nursing and Older People's Care.

References

Place of birth missing (living people)
Year of birth missing (living people)
Elderly care
British medical researchers
Dames Commander of the Order of the British Empire
Academics of the University of Central Lancashire
NIHR Senior Investigators
Living people